The , is an  or  (painted narrative handscroll) from the 12th century, in either the  or  periods of Japanese history. The long paintings in the work were executed in a simple, uncluttered,  style typical of Japanese paintings of the time.

Background
 

Originating in Japan in the sixth or seventh century through trade with the Chinese Empire,  art spread widely among the aristocracy in the Heian period. An  consists of one or more long scrolls of paper narrating a story through  texts and paintings.

The narrative assumes a series of scenes, the rhythm, composition and transitions of which are entirely determined by the artist's sensitivity and technique. The themes of the stories were very varied: illustrations of novels, historical chronicles, religious texts, biographies of famous people, humorous or fantastic anecdotes, etc. The narrative paintings, and especially the  telling the story of the founding of temples or the lives of famous monks, were also fertile ground for Buddhist proselytism.

Description

The first part of the text tells the tale of a hunter named  from Kii Province in the 8th century. Several nights in a row,  with a thousand arms revealed himself to this hunter by a strange light, so much so that  decided to build him a temple there. The second part of the text describes a miracle associated with this statue. In legend, a young monk one day healed the sick daughter of a wealthy man with prayers. The wealthy man and his family made a pilgrimage there the following year. Going up the course of the  River, they discovered the shrine and the image of Kannon with a thousand arms, adorned with the dagger and the red .

Dating and author
The creation date and author of the work are unknown, but it is commonly dated to the end of the 12th century (either late in the  period (794–1185) or at the beginning of the  period (1185–1333)). Specialists are divided on the possible existence of an older version or a study.

Style and composition

The paintings also observe a regular composition in three planes: a natural foreground (rocks, trees) serving to create depth in the scene; the figures and landscape elements (buildings, roads, fields, etc.) of the story occupying the entire center; and finally a distant and stylized landscape at the top of scroll. This composition is inspired by the canons of Chinese art of the Tang dynasty with typically Japanese variations. The unrealistic perspective is classically based on parallel lines and the point of view is always the same, slightly elevated at the front. On the other hand, the lines and outlines in ink are finer and less free than in the other  works. Here, the lines are characterized by their simplicity; landscape elements are stylised and used mainly to mark transitions between scenes. The narration is based on the repetition of scenes, fundamentally almost unchanged like the representation of the temple or the hunter's hut, in order to illustrate a succession of consecutive events.

Historiographical value

A mirror of society,  are an important source of information on the civilisation and medieval history of Japan. This particular  accurately illustrates the daily life of the Japanese at the very beginning of the  period, especially in its portrayal of ordinary people and local warriors. A study by Kanagawa University presents in detail the elements of daily life illustrated by the five paintings of the scroll, including residences, clothing, activities and works, trips, food, amenities such as bridges, and also the temple.

Provenance
The  has been owned for centuries, and is still owned, by the  temple. Today it is listed in the Register of National Treasures of Japan, and is exhibited at the Kyoto National Museum.

See also
List of National Treasures of Japan (paintings)
National Treasure (Japan)

References

Notes

Bibliography

External links

 Kokawa-dera Engi Emaki – on the Kyoto National Museum website [archived version (24 May 2014)]

Emakimono
National Treasures of Japan